Moluk (also Romanized as Molūk and Malūk; also known as Malek and Molok) is a village in Yeylaq Rural District, in the Central District of Kaleybar County, East Azerbaijan Province, Iran. At the 2006 census, its population was 116, in 29 families.

References 

Populated places in Kaleybar County